National Institute of Pharmaceutical Education and Research, Kolkata (NIPER Kolkata) is an Indian public pharmaceutical research university, located in Kolkata, West Bengal, India. As one of the seven National Institutes of Pharmaceutical Education and Research (NIPERs) it is granted the Institute of National Importance status. It offers 2-year MS (Pharm.) programmes and doctoral programmes in pharmaceutical sciences. On 2016 Institute pact with Sanofi India to promote academic excellence and research in the areas of pharmaceuticals and consumer healthcare products, to cater to the current and future needs of the pharmaceutical industry.

Ranking

National Institute of Pharmaceutical Education and Research, Kolkata was ranked 27 in India by the National Institutional Ranking Framework (NIRF) pharmacy ranking in 2020.

References

External links
 Home page

Universities and colleges in Kolkata
National Institute of Pharmaceutical Education and Research
Research institutes in Kolkata
Pharmaceutical industry of India
Research institutes in West Bengal
Educational institutions established in 2007
2007 establishments in West Bengal